Milena Greppi (8 July 1929 – 13 December 2016) was an Italian hurdler.

Biography
Milena Greppi was born in Milan into an aristocratic family. Her father was Antonio Greppi (1901–1991), 8th Count of Bussero and Corneliano and her mother was Aurora Mattei. She participated at two editions of the Summer Olympics (1952 and 1956), and had 23 caps in national team from 1951 to 1958.

Achievements

National titles
Milena Greppi won five times the individual national championship.
7 wins on 80 metres hurdles (1952, 1953, 1954, 1955, 1956)

See also
 Italy national relay team

References

External links
 

1929 births
Italian female sprinters
Italian female hurdlers
Athletes (track and field) at the 1952 Summer Olympics
Athletes (track and field) at the 1956 Summer Olympics
Athletes from Milan
Olympic athletes of Italy
2016 deaths
European Athletics Championships medalists
20th-century Italian women
21st-century Italian women